Sir Anthony Joseph Francis O'Reilly  (born 7 May 1936) is an Irish former businessman and international rugby union player. He is known for his involvement in the Independent News & Media Group, which he led from 1973 to 2009, and as former CEO and chairman of the H.J. Heinz Company. He was the leading shareholder of Waterford Wedgwood. Perhaps Ireland's first billionaire, as of 26 May 2014 O'Reilly was being pursued in the Irish courts for debts amounting to €22 million by AIB, following losses amounting to hundreds of millions of euros in his unsuccessful attempt to stop Denis O'Brien from assuming control of Independent News & Media.

As a rugby player, he represented Ireland, the British and Irish Lions and the Barbarians and is enshrined as a member of the International Rugby Board's Hall of Fame. O'Reilly has six children and 19 grandchildren and is married to Chryss Goulandris. He lived in Lyford Cay in the Bahamas until 2017, when the property was sold for less than €12 million as part of a bankruptcy arrangement. O'Reilly now lives in Chateau des Ducs de Normandie in Bonneville-sur-Touques in France.

Early years

Parents

O'Reilly was born in Dublin, Ireland, and was the only child of a civil servant, John O'Reilly (1906–1976), and Aileen O'Connor (1914–1989). O'Reilly's Drogheda-born father, eventually an inspector-general of customs, was born "Reilly" and added the O when he applied to join the Irish Civil Service. Previously married with four older children, but estranged from his first wife, John O'Reilly married Aileen O'Connor in 1973, after the death of his first wife and only a little time after he had told his son of his other family.The Irish Times, Dublin, Ireland, 12 February 1994: Weekend section, page 3, "Paperchaser", Jim Dunne O'Reilly had been told about the situation by a Jesuit when he was 15, but kept it secret. He arranged for the John and Aileen O'Reilly Library at Dublin City University to be named after his parents, and O'Reilly Hall at University College Dublin to be named after his father, who had studied there.

O'Reilly, named "Tony" after his mother's favourite brother, grew up on Griffith Avenue, a broad middle-class street in the Drumcondra/Glasnevin area of Dublin. He had prominent red hair. He holidayed with family, including an aunt in Balbriggan, cousins in Sligo and others in Drogheda. In 1951, the family moved to a bungalow in Santry.

Education

Educated at Belvedere College from the age of six, O'Reilly was known for sporting proficiency in football, cricket and tennis and rugby union. As a youth he played soccer for Home Farm. In cricket he was a member of the Junior Cup-winning team in 1950; in tennis, he was in a Leinster Schools Cup-winning team, and reached the under-15 national semi-finals. He was also noted for his acting skills (notably in Gilbert and Sullivan operettas such as Iolanthe, and Dunsany's A Night at an Inn). He was an altar boy, and a regular attender at chapel, and during his time there spent a summer in the Gaeltacht to improve his Irish language skills. He passed the Leaving Certificate at 17, and with four school mates, studied philosophy, still at Belvedere, for a year after this, while developing his rugby. He was a prefect for his last two years at the school, and a senior member of a key sodality.

O'Reilly went on to study law at University College, Dublin and then at the Incorporated Law Society of Ireland. He came fifth in Ireland in intermediate exams in 1956, and first and third in the country in final examinations in 1958, and was enrolled as a solicitor in November 1958. He never practised after training, but later became chairman of the major Dublin solicitors' firm now known as Matheson.

O'Reilly earned a PhD in agricultural marketing from the University of Bradford, and in addition, holds at least one honorary doctorate.

Rugby Union career

Ireland

Between 1955 and 1970 O'Reilly won 29 caps for Ireland. His Five Nations career of 15 years, 23 days is the longest in history, a record shared with fellow Ireland great Mike Gibson. He made his senior international debut, aged just 18, against France on 22 January 1955. He scored his four tries for Ireland against France on 28 January 1956; against Scotland on 25 February 1956; against Wales in 1959; and against France in 1963. He made his final appearance for Ireland on 14 February 1970, after a six-year absence from the national team, against England. This final appearance was an 11th-hour replacement, denying Frank O'Driscoll—father of Brian, Ireland's most-capped player—what would prove to be his only chance at a Test cap.

British Lions 

O'Reilly toured twice with the British Lions, on their 1955 tour to South Africa and their 1959 tour to Australia and New Zealand. He made his debut for the Lions on 26 June 1955, scoring two tries against a Northern Universities XV. He played 15 games during the 1955 tour, scoring 16 tries. This included hat-tricks against a North Eastern Districts XV on 20 July and Transvaal on 23 July. He also played in all four Tests against South Africa, making his Test debut on the right wing before a crowd of 95,000 at Ellis Park on 6 August. He scored a try in the Lions 23–22 victory. He scored another try in the fourth Test on 24 September.

On the 1959 tour, he played a further 23 games and scored 22 tries. This included a hat-trick against King Country/Counties on 19 August. He played in all six tests, two against Australia and four against New Zealand. He scored tries in the two test wins against Australia and in the first and fourth tests against New Zealand. His total of 38 tries for the Lions on two tours remains a record.

Barbarians

Between 1955 and 1963 O'Reilly also made 30 appearances and scored 38 tries for the Barbarians. He made his debut on 9 April 1955 in a 6–3 win against Cardiff, and his final appearance against Swansea on 15 April 1963. On the Barbarians' 1958 tour of South Africa, O'Reilly scored 12 tries, seven of them in the game against East Africa. He remains the Barbarians record holder for both appearances  and tries.

Later rugby involvement

O'Reilly was a member of the IRFU Commercial Committee. He was in the first class of inductees into the International Rugby Hall of Fame in 1997, and was inducted into the IRB Hall of Fame in 2009.

Business career

O'Reilly went from college to work as a management consultant for Weston-Evans in Ashby-de-la-Zouch, Leicestershire, he earned £200 annually, which was a very good salary by the then Irish standards. While there, he continued his rugby career, with Leicester. His work included cost accounting and time-and-motion studies, in industries ranging from shoe-making to pottery.

He then moved to Sutton's of Cork, selling agricultural products, coal and oil.

Irish Semi-State sector

He joined An Bord Bainne, the Irish Dairy Board, in 1962, as General Manager, and developed the successful Kerrygold "umbrella brand" for Irish export butter. In 1966 he became Managing Director of the Irish Sugar Company. He soon developed a joint venture for freeze-drying food with the H. J. Heinz Co.

In February 1963, O'Reilly was involved in an accident between Urlingford and Johnstown, when his car struck a cyclist, who was injured. Locals testified that the injured man was careless, and he had no lights or reflector, and had been on the wrong side of the road. O'Reilly was convicted of driving with undue care, and fined 4 pounds, and since then he has rarely driven, especially at night.

Heinz

In 1969, after discussion with the Taoiseach Jack Lynch, who offered him a post such as Minister for Agriculture if he would stay, O'Reilly joined Heinz. There he made his name in international business, becoming MD of the Heinz subsidiary in the UK, its largest non-US holding and the source of half of the group profit.

He moved to the company HQ in Pittsburgh in 1971 when he was promoted to Senior Vice President for the North America and Pacific region. In 1973, R. Burt Gookin and Jack Heinz made him COO and President. He became CEO in 1979 when Mr. Gookin then Vice Chairman and Chief Executive Officer retired.

O'Reilly earned his Ph.D. in 1980, with a thesis on agricultural incomes and marketing in Ireland. Though he was proud of his work with Bord Bainne, Irish Sugar and the Erin – Heinz JV, he concluded that Irish farmers were benefiting much more from price-boosting subsidies than from commercial development.

He became Chairman of Heinz in 1987, succeeding HJ Heinz II, and becoming the first non-Heinz family member to hold that post. His guidance was seen as having helped transform the company into a major international competitor, its value increasing twelvefold (from $908 million to $11 billion). O'Reilly left Heinz in 1998 after several years during which analysts questioned the company's performance, and after challenges from corporate governance groups and major pension funds including CalPERS and Business Week magazine; he was succeeded by his deputy, William R. Johnson.

Other business interests

During his time at Heinz, O'Reilly held roles as a major shareholder and chairman of several companies, including Waterford Wedgwood (1995–2009) and Independent News & Media, and of a major partnership of solicitors, Matheson, in Dublin. Provision for him to do this was written into his contract before he went to the United States. After he left Heinz, he focused on three of these: Independent News & Media; Waterford Wedgwood; and Fitzwilton; and later, for a brief time, Eircom. He was the main shareholder in Arcon, the Irish base-metal mining company that developed the Galmoy lead-zinc deposit, the company being co-founded with Richard Conroy, and later sold to Lundin Mining in 2005. He also retained a 40% stake in Providence Resources Plc, the Irish-based oil and gas exploration and development company.

Independent News & Media

O'Reilly bought into Independent News & Media (INM), a Dublin-based print media company, in 1973, and having held over 28%, with leverage over more than 29.5% with family and other connected parties, had his shareholding diluted sharply since 2009. He pushed the company to expand into other national markets and to increase its reach in Ireland. In the 1990s INM bought into South Africa (from 1994), Australia (from 1988) and New Zealand (from 1995), acquiring 38 newspaper titles, over 70 radio stations, cable and telecoms interests at a cost of around €1.3 billion. In the United Kingdom, INM  took control of the national broadsheet The Independent in 1995, edging out MGN and Prisa. The company has over 200 national and regional newspaper and magazine titles in total, revenues of €1.7 billion and profits of €110.7 million. The group has assets of around €4.7 billion and debts in the region of €1.3 billion.
On Friday 13 March 2009, it was announced that on O'Reilly's 73rd birthday, 7 May, he would resign as both CEO and a member of the Board of INM, to be succeeded by his son, Gavin. Further, the often-criticised large size of the board would be reduced from 17 to 10, and would include three nominees of Denis O'Brien. These announcements were actioned, and O'Reilly became President Emeritus of the group. The markets reacted positively to the news, especially to the explicit truce between the O'Reilly and O'Brien shareholder blocs, with Denis O'Brien voicing public support for Gavin O'Reilly as CEO-designate.

Interests beyond IN&M

Among other investments, O'Reilly has or had until recently, interests in:
 Fitzwilton, an industrial holding and investment company established with friends (Ferguson and Leonard) in the early 1970s. Over the years, the Company has been involved in numerous business activities ranging from textiles, to house construction, to fertiliser manufacturing, to bottling, to oil and gas investments, to supermarkets to light manufacturing. Taken private in the late 1990s in conjunction with his brother-in-law, the company is now involved in light manufacturing, property investments, financial services and architectural signage
 Waterford Wedgwood Plc, the majority of which was placed in administration on 5 January 2009, and of which he was chairman until that date
 Providence Resources Plc, an Irish-based oil and gas exploration and production company, in which he holds a stake of at least 40%. The company has interests in Ireland, the UK, the US and Nigeria
 Landis+Gyr, one of the world's largest smart metering companies, in which he held a 7% stake prior to its sale to Toshiba

Lockwood and E-mat

In conjunction with his brother-in-law, in 1996, he backed a management team that created Lockwood Financial Partners (and its sister company E-mat). Lockwood, based in Malvern Pennsylvania, specialised in providing independent financial investment advisory services to brokers of high-net-worth individuals, and went on to become one of the largest independent advisory companies in the United States before being sold to Bank of New York in 2001. At the time, assets under management were estimated to be in excess of $11 billion.

Eircom and Valentia
He was part of the Valentia consortium that bought into Eircom, the former Irish state phone company, in November 2001, for €2.8 billion, beating a rival offer of €3 billion. In 2004 the company was partly refloated, and in 2005 sold at a profit to Babcock & Brown of Australia.

Charitable works

O'Reilly has sponsored and supported a wide range of charitable activities, and continues to do so. Many of these, such as the many-year support of a Professorship in Australian Studies at UCD, were arranged together with his first wife, and likewise today, he and his current wife will often jointly support an activity, such as sponsorship of a gallery at the National Science Historical Museum''' adjacent to Birr Castle. He has shown a particular interest in naming rights, where a contribution to a project, generally of 5% to 20%, allows a donor to add a name to the project, and has received at least one such "name" as a gift.

Kilcullen

O'Reilly has supported many local initiatives, from floral street displays and signage for local nature walks in Kilcullen to commissioning, with his wife, a piece of music for the launch of the Dun Ailinne Interpretative Park. A presentation in recognition of this was made in mid-2009. O'Reilly is also the Patron of the Kilcullen GAA club.

The O'Reilly Foundation

The O'Reilly Foundation is a charity set up by O'Reilly with a Board of Trustees composed of family members, chaired by his wife, and a Scholarship Board headed by Professor Emeritus John Kelly of UCD, succeeding Ken Whitaker. With an office address at a family home in Dublin, and Amanda Hopkins as Executive Secretary, it contributes to various projects, with an emphasis on the education sector, primarily running an annual scholarship programme, awarding 2–3 advanced, usually multi-year, third-level scholarships, each for over €20,000 per annum.

Both through the Foundation and before its inception, O'Reilly has contributed to a range of University projects in Ireland, with notable examples at Dublin City University, University College Dublin, Trinity College Dublin and Queen's University Belfast.

O'Reilly also paid for the construction of the state-of-the-art 600-seat O'Reilly Theatre in Belvedere College, and has regularly funded projects in the college. The family also contributed to the construction of the O'Reilly Theatre in Pittsburgh, Pennsylvania, and the 181 seat O'Reilly Theatre at Keble College, Oxford.

Trinity College, Dublin

O'Reilly has contributed towards the O'Reilly Institute, backed the development of Jewish Studies, and supported the Chair in Neuroscience. He was a Pro-Chancellor of the University of Dublin from 1994 until retiring on age grounds at the end of the 2010/2011 academic year, and was also a member of the board of the Trinity Foundation.

University College Dublin

O'Reilly supported his alma mater, UCD, by funding the O'Reilly Hall, named in honour of his parents. This building is a major focal point of the UCD campus and in addition to its use for exams, the hall is now a leading venue for large events in Dublin.

Dublin City UniversityThe John and Aileen O`Reilly Library at Dublin City University was named in honour of his parents, as the O`Reilly Foundation contributed a substantial sum to the library's capital costs in 2000.

Queen's University Belfast

The new library currently under construction at Queen's University of Belfast was to be named the Sir Anthony O'Reilly Library, in recognition of support for the University, including a pledge of £4 million (of a £44 Million cost for the library), £2 Million from his personal charity, The O'Reilly Foundation and £2 Million from Independent News and Media / The Belfast Telegraph and the Ireland Funds. The new library will now be known as either "The New Library" or "The Library at Queen's" after a request by O'Reilly in April 2009.

The Ireland Funds

The American Ireland Fund, now the central entity in The Ireland Funds, was established in Boston by O'Reilly and his friend, Pittsburgh businessman Dan Rooney, in 1976, and for many years this and later similar initiatives in other countries, took up a considerable amount of his time. The funds, now a network with more than ten national entities, have raised over $600 million to date. O'Reilly is the Chairman. Rooney became US Ambassador to Ireland in July 2009.

Personal life

Family

O'Reilly was first engaged in 1958, to Dorothy Collins, whom he'd met in 1954, with the marriage planned for 1959.

O'Reilly met his first wife, Australian secretary and pianist Susan M. Cameron, the daughter of a wealthy Australian mining figure in whose name he endowed a professorship at UCD for at least a decade, in 1959 in Australia, after she was suggested as a social contact when he was touring for rugby. After courting her when she moved to London, they married in 1962. He had six children by her, born 1963–66: Susan Wildman, Anthony Cameron O'Reilly (generally "Cameron"), Justine O'Reilly, Gavin O'Reilly, Caroline Dempsey, and St John Anthony ("Tony Junior"); the last three are triplets. All three boys are involved in family business interests, while the daughters are not known to be, the eldest being a qualified pilot, the second a lawyer and the third a full-time mother. The eldest daughter took a bachelor's degree at Yale, and a master's degree in history at Oxford.

All the O'Reilly children married and O'Reilly has 19 grandchildren. Youngest daughter Caroline was married at the restored Church of St. Mary at Castlemartin Estate on 1 June 1991, while eldest child Susan O'Reilly married investment banker Tarik C. Wildman (1959–) on 14 August 1993 before an Episcopal dean at the same church. Gavin O'Reilly married Alison Doody there some years later.

The O'Reillys separated in the late 1980s, and Susan O'Reilly settled in London, in a house bought by O'Reilly. Susan O'Reilly died in 2014.

Shortly after, O'Reilly married Chryss Goulandris, a Greek shipping heiress, who breeds and races thoroughbred horses as "Skymarc Farms" and under other names, and who owns stud farms in Normandy and other locations. Chryss is well known on the racecourses of Ireland, Britain and France as Lady O'Reilly and is very knowledgeable on all aspects of the equine industry. They first met in New York, when Chryss accompanied her brother to a business meeting.

The wedding took place in the Bahamas on 4 September 1991. Chryss made a naming gift in her husband's honour in 1999 with the O'Reilly Theater in Pittsburgh, and he bought her a famous Jackie Onassis diamond ring for over US$2 million. The second Mrs O'Reilly's brother has been a close business ally of O'Reilly for many years since around the time of the marriage.

Residences

A number of homes are associated with O'Reilly, including his former main residence, Lissadell Tamura, with a beach in the private gated community Lyford Cay near Nassau in the Bahamas. For many years his principal residence and later a major base, was Castlemartin, a "big house" dating in current form from the 18th century, at Kilcullen, County Kildare (which has associated stud farm and cattle breeding premises on the large estate lands). O'Reilly purchased Castlemartin in 1972 from the Earl of Gowrie, and spent millions on improvements to the house and on the restoration of the 15th century Church of St Mary in the grounds. On 15 February 2008 permission was granted for the development of two ancillary houses on a remote part of the estate, adjoining Kilcullen (Bridge) village's main street, incorporating residential, restaurant and retail space. In October 2007, O'Reilly paid a record €125,000 per acre for  Hollyhill Stud in Carnalway near Brannockstown, under 3 kilometres from Kilcullen. The stud farm on the banks of the Liffey, with a 10-room house and a cottage, was thought to have been intended for one of his daughters.

In late 1995, he and his wife purchased a former solicitor's office, a four-storey Georgian house at 2 Fitzwilliam Square, Dublin, with a courtyard and coach house with a separate entrance. The 1 million Irish pound house, formerly owned by railway pioneer William Dargan, was a base when travel to Castlemartin was not feasible, and a place for meetings and his private office. O'Reilly also has a holiday compound, Shorecliffe, comprising several houses, garden areas and two swimming pools, by the sea in Glandore, County Cork.

The O'Reillys also owned a chateau "built on the ruins of the castle where William the Conqueror plotted his 1066 invasion of England" at Deauville in France.

This property, his second home in that area, with eight bedrooms and bathrooms, an "Irish bar" in the basement, tennis courts, Japanese and English-themed gardens and swimming and tennis facilities, was sold for around $US2.4 million in 2000

The residential complex in Glandore, the house on Fitzwilliam Square and the Castlemartin Estate have all since been auctioned off at sales forced by O'Reilly's creditors. O'Reilly now lives in Chateau des Ducs de Normandie in Bonneville-sur-Touques in France.

Sporting interests

O'Reilly's sons have noted that he is still a keen player of tennis. For a period in the 1990s O'Reilly chaired a committee set up by the then Lord Mayor of Dublin, Gay Mitchell, aiming to bring the Olympic Games to Dublin in 2004.

Art collection

The O'Reillys have been significant art collectors for many years, with the biggest known acquisition being Monet's Le Portail (Soleil), bought in 2000, at Sotheby's of London, for $US24 million, and others including works by William Orpen and Jack Yeats, and bronzes and statues. In June 2008 it was reported that O'Reilly had commissioned a bound catalogue of his art collection, 15 cm thick, at a cost of €125,000 for 500 copies, edited by Suzanne Macdougald and with notes by, among others, Bruce Arnold. Copies were said to have been given to the President of Ireland and the Queen of the United Kingdom.

Other key figures

Friends

O'Reilly is an enthusiastic networker, and from early developed a wide range of acquaintances and friends. Among the closest were Kevin McGoran and Jim McCarthy.

He made contacts at high levels, which sometimes included becoming friendly with controversial figures such as Henry Kissinger and the late Robert Mugabe. He hosted the late Nelson Mandela more than once, and knows a range of Irish and American politicians.

Staff

For over 47 years, from his time at Suttons of Cork, O'Reilly had a strong executive secretary, Olive Deasy (1932–2007), who managed aspects of his work and personal lives, living with his family for much of this time Also important was his driver, Arthur Whelan.

O'Reilly's executive secretary in Dublin is Mandy Scott, while from 2000 to 2009, O'Reilly also had a personal nurse and assistant, Sabina Vidunas, who travelled with him.

Awards and honours

In 1978, O'Reilly was awarded an honorary Doctorate of Laws (LLD) by Trinity College Dublin.

In 1988, he was appointed an Honorary Officer of the Order of Australia (AO) for services to Irish-Australian relationships.

O'Reilly was knighted in the 2001 New Year Honours "for services to Northern Ireland" – including in recognition for his work as head of The Ireland Funds charity. O'Reilly, who describes himself as a constitutional nationalist, sought the approval of the Irish Government in relation to the award, because it is a requirement of the Constitution of Ireland that "No title of nobility or of honour may be accepted by any citizen except with the prior approval of the Government". As O'Reilly is also a British subject, in part due to his pre-1949 Irish birth, he holds a substantive and not just an honorary knighthood, and can validly style himself Sir, as he has done; see British honours system.

Wealth and bankruptcy

In May 2014 the Sunday Times reported that O'Reilly and his wife had a net worth of around US$545 million, down sharply from March 2012, when the Sunday Independent reported that O'Reilly had a net worth of €1 billion, excluding his wife's estimated €300 million from her shipping family inheritances.

O'Reilly became locked in a legal case with a State-controlled bank, AIB (Allied Irish Bank), in relation to his multimillion-euro debts, with AIB seeking a summary judgment against him at the High Court. The commercial court in Dublin refused a six-month stay or delay in a judgement against O'Reilly. In June 2014, the court entered a judgement of nearly 46 million euro against him. Judge Peter Kelly said he believed there was force in the argument that O'Reilly and his investment companies were insolvent. During the hearing, lawyers for O'Reilly admitted that he also owed large amounts to other banks and financial institutions.  This meant O'Reilly would have to sell properties in Ireland to meet his debts to AIB bank.

In the wake of AIB's €22.6 million judgment debt against him, O'Reilly filed for bankruptcy in March 2016. His lawyers disclosed that he had liabilities of more than €170 million and realisable assets of only €23 million. ACC Bank was owed the most, holding a debt of almost €47 million; it was followed by the UK’s Lloyds Bank International with €45.6 million and US distressed debt fund Lone Star Funds with €44 million. Among the Irish banks, AIB was then owed €15.5 million (having reduced its debt by collecting most of the €7.4 million sale proceeds of O’Reilly’s County Kildare home, Castlemartin); Bank of Ireland was at the time owed €2.1 million and Ulster Bank €1.2 million, while he owed €7.2 million to Bahamian lender EFG Bank & Trust and €5.7 million to BNY Mellon (Bank of New York Mellon).

O'Reilly's former long-time nurse and assistant of 13 years, Sabina Vidunas, filed a lawsuit against O'Reilly in Pennsylvania in 2013, claiming that he owed her $40 million stock in a deal that he reneged on. O'Reilly's lawyers argued that his Bahamas bankruptcy applied also in America and thus negated her claim, however the US Bankruptcy Court for the Western District of Pennsylvania declared that O'Reilly cannot claim that his Bahamas bankruptcy automatically applies in the United States, because by then his "center of main interests" did not lie in the Bahamas" but in France, where he had settled since the case began. Because no evidence was presented of "any operations or nontransitory economic activity in the Bahamas", the Bahamian bankruptcy would probably not be recognised for a lesser, "non-main center", argument either. Vidunas's lawsuit was still ongoing as of 2020.

Biography
An authorised biography, The Player: The Life of Tony O'Reilly, was written by Ivan Fallon, a journalist and biographer in the early 1990s, later a senior executive at one of O'Reilly's companies, and was for many years the only study of any length. O'Reilly facilitated the project, and the author was given access to family members, including past and current wives, and to staff and business colleagues. Fallon insisted in the foreword that he had complete discretion on what to include and how to tell it, excluding only some private family matters. While giving great detail on some business matters, the book says almost nothing about O'Reilly's children and little of his second wife. It gives considerable detail on business matters, and does question some of O'Reilly's assertions, notably about his Irish business interests. It also gives much information on O'Reilly's parents' situations and especially his father's family, some of which the author notes even O'Reilly did not have until the book gathered it, and includes some detail about his residences.

In 2015, another biography of O'Reilly was written by journalist Matt Cooper and published by Gill and Macmillan. Titled "The Maximalist: The Rise and Fall of Tony O'Reilly", the book is said to offer an "overview of a man described by the publishers as "one of Ireland's most remarkable public figures"".

See also

 List of billionaires

Notes and references

Cited sources
Fallon, Ivan (1994) The Player: The Life of Tony O'Reilly''. Coronet.

External links
 The O`Reilly Foundation 
 
 Sir Anthony O'Reilly speech at The Ireland Funds Gala Evening 2007 (video)

1936 births
20th-century Irish philanthropists
21st-century Irish philanthropists
Living people
Tony
Businesspeople from Dublin (city)
Irish billionaires
Irish knights
Kilcullen
O'Reilly Foundation
Ireland Funds
Irish rugby union players
Ireland international rugby union players
Alumni of the University of Bradford
Alumni of University College Dublin
Waterford Wedgwood
British businesspeople
British billionaires
British expatriates in the Bahamas
Leinster Rugby players
Old Belvedere R.F.C. players
Barbarian F.C. players
Irish mass media owners
Irish newspaper publishers (people)
British & Irish Lions rugby union players from Ireland
Leicester Tigers players
London Irish players
Republic of Ireland association footballers
Home Farm F.C. players
World Rugby Hall of Fame inductees
Goulandris family
Knights Commander of the Order of the British Empire
Knights Bachelor
Honorary Officers of the Order of Australia
Irish patrons of music
Irish patrons of literature
Irish Independent people
Sunday Independent (Ireland) people
Sunday Tribune people
People educated at Belvedere College
Heinz people
Rugby players and officials awarded knighthoods
Association footballers not categorized by position
Rugby union players from Dublin (city)
Association footballers from Dublin (city)
Rugby union wings